Hrušica is a settlement  west of Jesenice along the main road to Kranjska Gora in the Municipality of Jesenice in the Upper Carniola region of Slovenia.

Geography
Hrušica lies above the left bank of the Sava River below Hrušica Peak in the Karawanks to the north, and Mount Kisovec and the Mežakla Plateau to the south. Dobršnik Creek, which has its source below Hrušica Peak, flows through the western part of the settlement. The Hrušica Pasture ( or Hruška planina) and Petelin Pasture lie above Hrušica in the Karawanks.

History
In 1906 the  two-rail track Karawanks railway tunnel was built at Hrušica and in 1991 the  road tunnel was completed.

Mass graves
Hrušica is the site of three mass grave from the period immediately after the Second World War. All of the graves contain the remains of Home Guard prisoners of war that were repatriated from Austria after the war and murdered. Each site contains the remains of an unknown number of victims. The Hrušica No. 56 Mass Grave is located behind the house at Huršica no. 56.

Notable people
Notable people that were born or lived in Hrušica include:
Anže Kopitar (born 1987), ice hockey player
Ivan Krivec (a.k.a. Pavle) (1906–1944), Partisan and communist party secretary

References

External links 

Hrušica on Geopedia
history, at Volunteer Firefighters of Hrušica

Populated places in the Municipality of Jesenice